Alfonso Reyes Echandía (14 July 1932 – 7 November 1985) was a Colombian educator, jurist and magistrate of the Supreme Court of Colombia who served as its President from 24 January 1985 until his death in the Palace of Justice siege.

The Palace of Justice of Colombia is named after him.

References

1932 births
1985 deaths
People from Tolima Department
Colombian jurists
Universidad Externado de Colombia alumni
Magistrates of the Supreme Court of Justice of Colombia
Presidents of the Supreme Court of Justice of Colombia
Assassinated Colombian people
Deaths by firearm in Colombia